Mohamed Salama Badi (born 1966 in El Aaiun, Western Sahara) is the current Sahrawi ambassador to Timor-Leste. He speaks Hassaniya (a variety of Arabic), and Spanish.

Personal life 
He was an activist and syndicalist in Moroccan-occupied Western Sahara during his youth. He graduated in Economics at Sétif university, in Algeria. He then moved to Spain to complete his education, earning a master's degree in "Conflicts, Peace and Development" at James I University in Castellon and a doctorate at the University of Granada.

Diplomatic postings 
He started his diplomatic career during the 1990s, as the head of the Sahrawi Arab Democratic Republic general delegation in Syria. Then, in the late 2000s, he joined the Pan-African Parliament in representation of his country. Finally, in 2010 he replaced Mohamed Kamal Fadel as ambassador of the SADR to Timor-Leste.

Honours and awards
On 16 May 2012, Salama Badi was awarded with the Order of Timor-Leste by President of East Timor José Ramos-Horta.

References 

Polisario Front politicians
Sahrawi Sunni Muslims
Living people
1966 births
Ambassadors of the Sahrawi Arab Democratic Republic to East Timor
Sahrawi activists
University of Granada alumni
Ambassadors of the Sahrawi Arab Democratic Republic to Syria
Members of the Pan-African Parliament from the Sahrawi Arab Democratic Republic
Recipients of the Order of Timor-Leste